Jari Mantila (born 14 July 1971 in Kotka) is a Finnish nordic combined athlete who competed from 1992 to 2003. He won a gold medal in the 4 x 5 km team event at the 2002 Winter Olympics and a silver medal at the 1998 Winter Olympics. Mantila also won five medals at the FIS Nordic World Ski Championships with one gold (4 x 5 km team: 1999), two silvers (15 km individual: 1995, 4 x 5 km team: 1997), and one bronze (4 x 5 km team: 2001).

External links
 
 

1971 births
People from Kotka
Finnish male Nordic combined skiers
Living people
Olympic Nordic combined skiers of Finland
Nordic combined skiers at the 1992 Winter Olympics
Nordic combined skiers at the 1994 Winter Olympics
Nordic combined skiers at the 1998 Winter Olympics
Nordic combined skiers at the 2002 Winter Olympics
Olympic gold medalists for Finland
Olympic silver medalists for Finland
Olympic medalists in Nordic combined
FIS Nordic World Ski Championships medalists in Nordic combined
Medalists at the 2002 Winter Olympics
Medalists at the 1998 Winter Olympics
Sportspeople from Kymenlaakso
20th-century Finnish people
21st-century Finnish people